John Owen, Jr. (August 18, 1861 – August 25, 1924) was an American athlete and businessman.

Biography
John Owen was born in Detroit, and took up athletics in 1889 at the ages of 28. He was discovered and coached by Mike Murphy at the Detroit Athletic Club. In 1890, he ran the 100-yard dash in a world record time of 9.8 seconds.

Owen died on August 25, 1924 after a horseback riding accident at his summer home on Mackinac Island.

References

External links
 

American male sprinters
1861 births
1924 deaths
Accidental deaths in Michigan
Deaths by horse-riding accident in the United States
Track and field athletes from Detroit
USA Outdoor Track and Field Championships winners